Cortinarius atrolazulinus is a fungus native to New Zealand.

It is not closely related to the group of dark purple webcaps (subgenus Cortinarius) that contains Cortinarius carneipallidus and Cortinarius violaceus.

See also
List of Cortinarius species

References

External links

Fungi described in 1987
atrolazulinus
Fungi of New Zealand